Ghulam Mustafa Bhat was the senior leader of Jammu & Kashmir National Conference and Mayor of Srinagar Municipal Corporation, the summer capital of the Indian territory of Jammu and Kashmir. At the age of 50, he died at Sher-i-Kashmir Institute of Medical Sciences in 2005. He remained Mayor of SMC for two years and was appointed as the deputy Advocate General by the state Government of Jammu and Kashmir.

References 

Mayors of places in Jammu and Kashmir
Jammu and Kashmir municipal councillors
Politicians from Srinagar
2011 deaths
Jammu & Kashmir National Conference politicians
People from Srinagar